Whistle is a 2013 Indian Kannada-language horror film starring Chiranjeevi Sarja alongside Pranitha Subhash, and directed by Prashant Raj of Love Guru  fame.
The story revolves around an engaged couple, who are chasing their dreams, the first of its kind in the Kannada Film Industry. It is a remake of the 2012 Tamil movie Pizza. Notable directors Guruprasad and Chi. Gurudutt appear as supporting roles in the film.

Plot 
The story begins on a romantic note with Ram, a pizza delivery boy, marrying his girlfriend Anu after she gets pregnant. The story takes a curious turn when Ram, who visits Smitha Bangalow to deliver pizza. The drama which follows in the haunted house is linked to diamonds.

Cast
 Chiranjeevi Sarja as Ram
 Pranitha as Anu
 Guruprasad 
 Chi. Gurudutt
 Vijaya Koundinya
 Hamsa Gowda
 Ravivarma

Soundtrack

Release
Whistle released on 12 July 2013 all over Karnataka in about 75+ theatres and PVR Cinemas in Delhi, Chennai, Pune, Mumbai and Hyderabad. Whistle was made on a decent budget and it collected Rs. 3.7 million in the first day itself and is having 70% occupancy in all theatres across Karnataka.

Reception

Critical response 

A critic from The Times of India scored the film at 3.5 out of 5 stars and says "Chiranjeevi Sarja has given life to the character with his expression. Pranitha has done justice to the role. Vijay Koundinya has done a good job in his brief appearance. Camera by Santhosh Rai Pathaje is marvelous. Music by Joshua Shridhar has some catchy tunes". A Sharadhaa from The New Indian Express wrote "Verdict: No match to Pizza, a lesson for those who think hit originals will always make for successful remakes. Whistle builds hopes and then leaves you wanting for the thrill of a scare". B S Srivani from Deccan Herald wrote "The few songs could have been dispensed of. Santosh Rai Pathaje excels again with the lighting and placement. Overall, a cracker of a film that deserves a long and sweet seeti. Whistle, please!". A critic from Bangalore Mirror wrote  "The hero of this film is cinematographer Santosh Rai Pataje. His images have always been clear and bright in daytime shots.  But here it is the indoor shots and scenes in the dark that show his ability. Whistle is a film that will make you forget the cold weather".

Other Versions 
 Pizza (2012 film) in Tamil and dubbed in Telugu, original
 Pizza (2014 film) in Hindi
 Golpo Holeo Shotti in Bengali

References

External links
 

2013 films
Films scored by Joshua Sridhar
Kannada remakes of Tamil films
2013 thriller films
Indian thriller films
Films directed by Prashant Raj
2010s Kannada-language films